Eduard Peterson (1892–?) was an Estonian politician. He was a member of II Riigikogu. He was a member of the Riigikogu since 25 April 1924. He replaced Juhan Must.

References

1892 births
Year of death missing
Workers' United Front politicians
Members of the Riigikogu, 1923–1926